Cheow Lan Lake or Rajjaprabha Dam Reservoir (RTGS: Ratchaprapha~), is in Khao Sok National Park in Surat Thani Province, Thailand. It is an  artificial lake, inaugurated in 1987 with the construction of Rajjaprabha Dam by the Electricity Generating Authority of Thailand (EGAT) as a source of electricity.

Rajjaprabha Dam

Rajjaprabha Dam, meaning 'light of the kingdom', got its name in May 1987 from the king at the opening ceremony on the king's 60th birthday. Before that day it was called the "Cheow Lan Project". It was designed as a multi-purpose project for power generation, flood control, irrigation, and fishery. In 1982, the Electricity Generating Authority of Thailand (EGAT) started construction of the dam by diverting the Klong Saeng River. It took about one year to completely flood the  basin. To flood this large area, 385 families of Ban Chiew Lan village were resettled. Rubber and other farming opportunities such as poultry, fruit orchards, vegetable farming, and reservoir fisheries were introduced together with the needed training programs and credit facilities to sustain farmers' incomes.

Each family received 19 rai of rubber plantation as well as one rai for their dwelling. As part of the compensation, the resettled people received 1,000 baht monthly per family. Resettlement drove the creation of basic public infrastructure, water supply systems, and public buildings such as schools, police station, medical center, and community hall—all built by the Thai government.

A resettlement of animals took place by boat and helicopter to prevent them from drowning or starving on new created islands. In 18 months 1,364 animals of 116 species were rescued, but 44 died soon after. Many fish species died due to the stagnant water conditions.

Tourism
The national park area is inhabited by a range of mammals such as tigers, elephants, tapirs and many monkey species. Birds such as hornbills, banded pittas, and great argus are as well forest residents. Less commonly seen reptiles include the king cobra, reticulated python, and flying lizards. The reservoir area includes the Khlong Saeng, Khlong Nakha and Kaeng Krung wildlife sanctuaries where rare animals can be found. West of Khao Sok National Park lies Sri Phang Nga National Park which extends the preservation area to 4,000 square kilometers.

Gallery

Notes

References

External links

 EGAT
 Chiew Lan - Multipurpose project
 Ratchaprabha Project
 “The future of large dams”, Thayer Scrudder, 2005, UK & USA
 to Rainforests-Mangroves to Mountains", Tom Henley, Dawn of Happiness Resort Co., 2001

Lakes of Thailand
Geography of Surat Thani province